Siward's Howe, sometimes written Siwards How and also known as Heslington Hill or Bunny Hill, is a terminal moraine located to the south-east of the city of York. 
The howe is situated north west of the Morrell Library building of the University of York.  The southern side of the howe is part of Alcuin College of the University of York. Its imposing water tower is visible from many parts of the nearby suburbs of Tang Hall and Osbaldwick.

Howe, when derived from the Old Norse: haugr, means hill, knoll, or mound and may refer to a tumulus, or barrow. Siward's Howe is named for Siward, Earl of Northumbria, the 11th-century Danish warrior. He was romanticised in the William Shakespeare play, Macbeth.

References

Other sources
Aird, William M. (2004)  Siward, earl of Northumbria (d. 1055), magnate (Oxford Dictionary of National Biography)

University of York
Moraines of Europe
Geography of York
Mountains and hills of North Yorkshire